Stephen "Steve" Keefe (born September 9, 1945) is an American chemist and politician.

Keefe was born in Minneapolis, Minnesota and received his bachelor's degree from University of Minnesota. He was a chemist and lived in Minneapolis, Minnesota. Keefe served in the Minnesota Senate from 1973 to 1980 and was a Democrat.

References

1945 births
Living people
Politicians from Minneapolis
American chemists
University of Minnesota alumni
Democratic Party Minnesota state senators